Abdulaziz al-Mahdali (born 1986, Fnideq, Morocco), known as Abu Usamah al-Maghrebi, was a senior military commander of the Islamic State of Iraq and the Levant.

History

He was one of the first to join Jabhat al-Nusra, at that time operating in Syria as a front group for the Islamic State of Iraq. When the Islamic State of Iraq and the Levant was declared by Abu Bakr al-Baghdadi, he remained loyal to IS, despite being offered the position of overall military commander in Jabhat al-Nusra.

He led many successful battles against the Syrian government including that against Sheikh Suleiman base, or Base 111, in  western Aleppo. He commanded the capture of Menagh Military Airbase as part of the Siege of Menagh Air Base along with nearby villages. He also led the 2013 Hama offensive and the battles in Sheikh Maqsoud neighborhood of Aleppo in March 2013 in which rebels succeeded in taking parts of the district.

Death

He died in an ambush by Jabhat al-Nusra fighters loyal to Abu Mohammad al-Julani in the town of Tel Jijan in March 2014, after he traveled there to attempt negotiations with them. According to Omar al-Shishani, a fellow senior IS military commander with whom he was close, he was betrayed and killed by a man whose life he had previously saved. He said in an IS released eulogy for Abu Usamah saying "The gratitude to Abu Usamah from that man was treacherous murder. I swear by Allah you will be brought to task for this treachery". A video eulogy was published for him by al-Furqan Media Foundation in April 2014.

References

1986 births
2014 deaths
Deaths in Syria
Islamic State of Iraq and the Levant members
Salafi jihadists
People from Fnideq
Moroccan Islamists